The Mist is an American science fiction-horror thriller television series developed by Christian Torpe. It is based on the 1980 horror novella of the same name by author Stephen King. The series aired for one 10-episode season on Spike from June 22 to August 24, 2017. Spike later cancelled the series on September 27 the same year.

Premise
An unexplained mist slowly envelops the town of Bridgeville, Maine, creating an almost impenetrable barrier to visibility. The residents of the town soon learn the situation is even more precarious as unexplained anomalies and phenomena in the mist attack and kill most who enter it, trapping several groups of people in a shopping mall, a church, and a hospital. Eventually, people begin to see apparitions in the mist from their past, fears, or guilt that help or kill them depending on how they react.

Cast and characters

Main

 Morgan Spector as Kevin Copeland
 Alyssa Sutherland as Eve Copeland
 Gus Birney as Alex Copeland
 Danica Curcic as Mia Lambert
 Okezie Morro as Bryan Hunt
 Luke Cosgrove as Jay Heisel
 Darren Pettie as Connor Heisel
 Russell Posner as Adrian Garff
 Frances Conroy as Nathalie Raven

Recurring
 Dan Butler as Gregory Romanov
 Steven Yaffee as Mikhail Demidoff
 Dylan Authors as Link
 Darcy Lindzon as Trevor
 Laurie Hanley as Ursula
 Isiah Whitlock Jr. as Gus Bradley
 Romaine Waite as Kyle
 Irene Bedard as Kimi Lucero
 Nabeel El Khafif as Raj El-Fayed
 Greg Hovanessian as Wes Foster
 Mishka Thebaud as Clint Spelling
 Shomari Downer as Elliot Carrillo
 Zenna Davis-Jones as Giselle Rodriguez
 Erik Knudsen as Vic
 Jonathan Malen as Ted
 Holly Deveaux as Zoe
 Andrea Lee Norwood as Susan Parker
 Alexandra Ordolis as Shelley DeWitt
 Lola Flanery as Lila DeWitt

Guest
 Mary Bacon as Mrs. Carmody
 John Dooks as Eric Carmody
 Christopher Gray as Tyler Denton
 Philip Ettinger as Nash
 Dwain Murphy as Bryan Hunt
 Neal Huff as Dr. Bailey
 Peter Murnik as Mike Copeland
 Marylouise Burke as Anna Lambert
 Shane Daly as Duncan Garff
 Nikki Barnett as Sandy Garff
 Kevin O'Grady as Officer Pundik
 Derek McGrath as Benedict Raven
 Teagle F. Bougery as Clay Greyson

Episodes

Production

Development
Following the release of Frank Darabont's film adaptation of The Mist in 2007, executive producers Bob Weinstein and Harvey Weinstein announced plans to develop a miniseries based on the film. In November 2013, Bob Weinstein announced that a 10-part miniseries would begin production under their Dimension Television banner. It was unclear if film director Darabont would be involved in the series and the development remained stagnant for a period of time.

In September 2015, nearly two years after the project was announced, Dimension Television announced they had signed screenwriter Christian Torpe to pen the entire series. In February 2016, Spike picked up the pilot. In April 2016, it was announced a deal had been reached with Spike to air the entire series. In July 2016, the production company announced the series had been cast and gone into production in Halifax, Nova Scotia.

Financing
The government of Nova Scotia announced in July 2016 that it would contribute  for the series. The production marks the biggest entertainment production ever to shoot in the province.

Casting
In July 2016, Dimension Television announced Morgan Spector would play the lead character of Kevin Copeland. Other cast members announced included Frances Conroy, Alyssa Sutherland, Zenna Davis-Jones, Gus Birney, Dan Butler, Luke Cosgrove, Danica Curcic, Okezie Morro, Darren Pettie, Russell Posner and Isiah Whitlock, Jr.

Ratings
After the pilot episode received strong ratings, viewer numbers rapidly declined. The series averaged a rating of 0.14 in adults aged 18–49, and 462,000 viewers per episode in Nielsen's Live+Same Day ratings. The series was canceled in September 2017.

Reception

Critical reception
The series received mixed reviews from critics, who praised its atmosphere and special effects, but criticized its story, performances, underdeveloped characters and unfaithfulness to the source material. On Rotten Tomatoes, the series has an approval rating of 60% based on 47 reviews, with an average rating of 5.7/10. The site's critical consensus reads, "The Mist absorbing atmosphere and solid special effects struggle to overcome a generally uninspired story and performances." On Metacritic, the series has a weighted average score of 54 out of 100 based on 25 critics, indicating "mixed or average reviews".

Chris Scott of The New York Observer described it as "relentlessly bleak, mean, and downright sadistic at nearly every turn", linking this with the falling ratings over the series' course. Indiewire reviewer Ben Travers described the plot as predictable and characters as "pretty awful", leaving viewers "rooting for the mist instead of those running from it".

Ed Power of The Daily Telegraph felt that it was a middling effort for King's works, and that it benefited from sticking to familiar horror themes and tropes.

References

External links
 

2017 American television series debuts
2017 American television series endings
2010s American drama television series
2010s American horror television series
2010s American science fiction television series
English-language television shows
Serial drama television series
Television shows based on works by Stephen King
Television series by The Weinstein Company
Television shows filmed in Halifax, Nova Scotia
Television shows set in Maine
American thriller television series